Safiabad (also Romanized as Şafīābād or Safi-Abad; also known as Şafī Khānī) is a city in the Central District of Dezful County, Khuzestan Province, Iran.  At the 2006 census, its population was 8,054, in 1,893 families.

Only Needles, California, United States has reported a lower humidity.

References

Populated places in Dezful County

Cities in Khuzestan Province